Kappatoo is a CITV comedy drama, based on the book by Ben Steed and starring Simon Nash in the dual roles of the eponymous time-traveller from the future and his lookalike, 1990s schoolboy soccer player Simon Cashmere. Andrew O'Connor played the human form of Kappatoo's computer (and also wrote some of the episodes), while Rula Lenska played a time-travelling villain, and Denise Van Outen and Sarah Alexander appeared in juvenile roles as schoolgirls.

In the series, Kappatoo travels back in time from the twenty-third century to 1990/92 to swap places with his identical 'time twin' Simon Cashmere, in order to cheat in a futuristic sports contest. Kappatoo lives in the past whilst Simon lives in the far off future.

The series premiered on CITV in 1990, with a follow-up series, Kappatoo II, broadcast in 1992; it was made by Worldwide International TV for Tyne Tees Television. Filming took place at Heaton Manor School in High Heaton, Newcastle upon Tyne with characters and extras using authentic school uniform from Heaton Manor School.

Episodes

Series 1

Series 2 (1992)

References

External links

1990 British television series debuts
1992 British television series endings
ITV children's television shows
British television shows based on children's books
British time travel television series
1990s British children's television series
English-language television shows
Television series by ITV Studios
Television shows produced by Tyne Tees Television